Ceratopsipes goldenensis is an ichnospecies of dinosaur footprint, described in 1995 from the Laramie Formation in Colorado. It is represented by massive pes prints approaching  in width.  If undistorted, the tracks may represent an unusually large Ceratopsian dinosaur that could have potentially been as large as 12 metres (39.4 feet).

See also

 List of dinosaur ichnogenera

References

Literature
 

Dinosaur trace fossils
Ceratopsians